The Big Four Grammy Awards (also known as the General Field) are four Grammy awards presented by the National Academy of Recording Arts and Sciences which go to musical acts and works which are not restricted by genre or another criterion.

Unlike the other Grammy awards, the nomination and voting process for the Big Four are open to all Academy voting members. They are the most prestigious and important awards at the ceremony.

The Big Four include:
 Album of the Year is awarded to the performer, songwriter(s), and the production team of a full album.
 Record of the Year is awarded to the performer and the production team of a single song.
 Song of the Year is awarded to the songwriter(s) of a single song.
 Best New Artist is awarded to an artist without reference to a song or album.

Recipients

1950s

1960s

1970s

1980s

1990s

2000s

2010s

2020s

See also 
 List of Grammy Award categories

References 

Grammy Awards
Grammy Award for Album of the Year
Grammy Award for Record of the Year
Grammy Award for Song of the Year